Shah Md. Ruhul Quddus is a Bangladesh Jamaat-e-Islami politician and the former Member of Parliament of Khulna-6.

Career
Quddus was elected to parliament from Khulna-6 as a Bangladesh Jamaat-e-Islami candidate in 1991 and 2001.

References

Bangladesh Jamaat-e-Islami politicians
Living people
5th Jatiya Sangsad members
8th Jatiya Sangsad members
Year of birth missing (living people)
People from Khulna District
University of Rajshahi alumni